A goblin is a  creature from European folklore.

Goblin may also refer to:

Goblin characters
Another name for orcs in the Middle-earth universe of J. R. R. Tolkien
Goblin (Dungeons & Dragons), a fictional humanoid creature in the Dungeons & Dragons role-playing game
Goblins (Harry Potter), creatures in the fictional Harry Potter world
Goblin (Marvel Comics), various goblin-themed fictional characters appearing in comic books published by Marvel Comics
Goblin (Warhammer), a race in the Warhammer games
Goblins, various troops commonly featured throughout the mobile games Clash of Clans and Clash Royale
Goblin, a fictional spirit companion of Tarquin Blackwood from The Vampire Chronicles series by Anne Rice

Arts and entertainment

Films, television shows and stage play
Goblin (film), a 2010 film directed by Jeffery Scott Lando
The Goblins, a stage play by Sir John Suckling that premiered in 1638
Guardian: The Lonely and Great God, also known as Goblin, a 2016 South Korean TV series
Troll 2, a 1990 B-horror movie produced under the title Goblins

Other media
Goblins (webcomic), written and illustrated by Ellipsis Stephens
Goblin, a fictional yacht in the 1937 book We Didn't Mean to Go to Sea by Arthur Ransome

Transportation
McDonnell XF-85 Goblin, an experimental aircraft
de Havilland Goblin (Halford H-1), an early jet engine
Gospel Oak to Barking line (GOBLIN), a railway line in north-east London, UK
Grumman G-23 fighter aircraft, known as the Goblin in Canadian service

Plants and animals
Glyptauchen panduratus, also known as the goblin fish
Goblin (chimpanzee), a chimpanzee who is featured in several books and documentaries
Goblin shark, a deep-sea species
Oonopidae, a spider family also known as Goblin spiders
A horse that finished fifth in the 1841 and 1843 Grand Nationals

Music
Goblin (band), an Italian progressive rock band
Goblin (album), a 2011 album and title song, by Tyler, the Creator
Orange Goblin, a British heavy metal band
"Goblin", a 2019 song by Sulli

Other
Dmitry Puchkov (born 1961), nicknamed Goblin, Russian media personality
Goblin Vacuum Cleaners, a British brand and a generic term for a vacuum cleaner dating from 1930s Britain
Goblin Valley State Park, Utah, U.S.
Goblin Combe, a valley in Somerset, England 
541132 Leleākūhonua, nicknamed The Goblin, a trans-Neptunian object

See also
Gobelins (disambiguation)
Gobliiins, a series of adventure video games by Coktel Vision